The Ministry of Defence of the Republic of Azerbaijan or MN is an Azerbaijani government agency that is associated with the Azerbaijani military. The ministry is responsible for keeping Azerbaijan defended against external threats, preserving its territorial integrity, waging war on behalf of Azerbaijan (for example, Azerbaijan’s contribution to the War on Terror), and the surveillance of the Azerbaijani sector of the Caspian Sea sea and airspace. The Minister of Defense is appointed and removed from the post by the Commander-in-chief of the Azerbaijani Armed Forces, the President of Azerbaijan.

The ministry building is located in Baku, at 3 Parliament Avenue.

History
The first minister of Azerbaijan Democratic Republic was General Khosrov bey Sultanov, who was appointed the Minister of the first Government on 28 May 1918. In accordance with Action Plan approved by Parliament on formation of the army, important structures and divisions were to be established by November 1, 1919.  Within the time given, artillery division, two infantry divisions consisting of three regiments, special telegraph, cavalry and machine gun platoons, railway battalions were to be created. 
Another priority of the government of Azerbaijan Democratic Republic was to establish Ministry of Defense. No minister of defense portfolio was officially instituted. But Khosrov bey Sultanov assumed the duties of the minister from May 28 through June 11, 1918. The Ministry of Defense of Azerbaijan Democratic Republic was established by a decision made on 23 October 1918. The decision was formalized on November 7 of the current year. After formalization of the decision Fatali-khan Khoyski was appointed the minister of defense. 
On December 26, 1918 Lieutenant General of the Russian Artillery Samad-bey Mehmandarov, took the office.  Lieutenant General Aliagha Shikhlinski appointed his deputy and Lieutenant General Suleyman Shulkevitch as the Chief of the General Staff. As the Ministry of Defense was officially dissolved in the wake of Azerbaijan's Sovietization in 1920, their functions were delegated to the People's Military Commissariat, and the Bolsheviks executed 15 of the 21 Army Generals of Azerbaijan. The newly-formed Azerbaijani Red Army replaced the previous army during the Russian Civil War.

In the midst of dissolution of Soviet Union and political turmoil in Azerbaijan in late 1980s, Azerbaijani military played an important role in the struggle for and retaining power.

The Ministry of Defense was established on September 5, 1991, following a resolution by the High Council of Azerbaijan SSR. One month later, on October 9 of the same year, the Armed Forces of Azerbaijan was established.

Leadership 
 Minister of Defense: Colonel General Zakir Hasanov
 Chief of the General Staff – First Deputy Minister of Defence: Lieutenant General Karim Valiyev
 Deputy Minister of Defence – Commander of the Combined Arms Army: Colonel General Kerem Mustafayev
 Deputy Minister of Defence – Chief of Main Department for Personnel: Lieutenant General Karim Valiyev
 Acting Deputy Minister of Defense for Logistics – Chief of the Main Department of Logistics: Lieutenant General Nizam Osmanov
 Deputy Minister of Defence – Commander of the Land Forces: Major General 
 Deputy Minister of Defence – Commander of the Air Force: Lieutenant General Ramiz Tahirov

Structure 

The ministry has the following structure:

 Central Command Post
 Main Department of Personnel
 Office for Women and Families of Servicemen
 Military Band Service
 Main Department of Logistics
 Main Department of Combat Training and Military Education
 Main Medical Department
 Organization and Mobilization Department
 Department of Staff
 Department for Ideological Work and Moral-Psychological Support 
 Legal Department
 Department of Finance and Budget
 Department of Affairs
 Department for Municipal Services
 Department for Defence Procurement and Equipment	
 Baku Garrison
Military Police
 Institutions
 "Azərbaycan Ordusu" newspaper
 Central Clinical Hospital
 Research Center
 Center for Documentary and Educational Films of the Azerbaijan Army
 Military Scientific Center
 Center for War Games of the Armed Forces
 Army Ideological and Cultural Center named after Hazi Aslanov
 Song and Dance Ensemble
Ideological and Cultural Center of the Ganja Garrison
Azerbaijan Military History Museum
MOIK Baku

Educational institutions under the Ministry 
 Military academies
 War College of the Armed Forces
 Training and Education Center of the Armed Forces
 Azerbaijan Higher Military Academy
 Azerbaijan Higher Naval Academy (former independent institution)
 Azerbaijan High Military Aviation School (former independent institution)
 Other educational institutions
 Secondary Military Medical School of Azerbaijan
 Military Medical Faculty of Azerbaijan Medical University
 Military lyceums
 Jamshid Nakhchivanski Military Lyceum
 Heydar Aliyev Military Lyceum

Military education system in Ministry of Defense is composed of educational institutions specialized on military and other relevant agencies that mainly focus on training and building a qualified and patriotic staff who is expected to implement the duties and tasks of armed forces and at the same time having adequate knowledge based on education standards of the country for guaranteeing the defense and security of Azerbaijan.

International military cooperation 
The main directions of international military cooperation:
 Bilateral and multilateral cooperation with the countries in the region and outside the region;
 Cooperation with the Euro-Atlantic structures;
 Cooperation with international organizations and defense-industrial complexes of foreign countries;
 Cooperation on military, military-political and military-technical for improving military security system;
 Study new programs and mechanisms 
 Broadening the participation in inspection activities set out under the Vienna Document 2011 "On Confidence and Security-Building Measures" and to the Treaty 1990 "On Conventional Armed Forces in Europe" (CFE);
 Expanding the activities related to the crisis prevention and armed conflicts management, as well as resolution and elimination of their consequences, with a focus on conflicting efforts to combat international terrorism, the proliferation of nuclear and other weapons of mass destruction, their components and vehicles, modern global challenges and threats arising from military operations;
 Broadening the scope of activities related to the fulfilment of commitments and obligations arising out of the cooperation with international organizations and military organizations of foreign countries in the area of international military cooperation;
 Providing more effective training for military personnel and units, whose participation in peacekeeping operations are planned, the study of international experience and application capabilities to contribute to improvement of the level of combat training and its compatibility.

Cooperation with OSCE 
The Ministry of Defense of the Republic of Azerbaijan supports the Office of the Personal Representative of the OSCE Chairperson-in-Office to conduct a ceasefire monitoring exercises on the Line of Confrontation of the armed forces of Armenia and Azerbaijan as well as on the state border.

Cooperation with NATO 
The Republic of Azerbaijan joined the NATO-led "Partnership for Peace" (PFP) programme on May 4, 1994, the NATO Planning and Review Process (PARP) in 1996. Azerbaijan joined the NATO military training and education program aimed at improving the school of sergeants in the Armed Forces of the Republic of Azerbaijan, training programs for junior officers and the inclusion of the subject "Strategy and Defense Planning" in the educational program of the Academy of Armed Forces as a new module. Azerbaijan has become a good partner at NATO-led operations in Kosova and Afghanistan and still contributes to Alliance’s mission in Afghanistan by deploying its peacekeeping forces in this country. Furthermore, on NATO advice, Azerbaijan developed strategic documents on defense and security, as well as, made improvements in this direction. Besides this, NATO and Azerbaijan cooperate on reorganizing units in accordance with NATO standards and on developing control and command capabilities of every armed service.

Cooperation with ICRC 
Cooperation between the Ministry of Defense of the Republic of Azerbaijan and International Committee of the Red Cross (ICRC) covers the issues of providing educational materials on the International Humanitarian Law (IHL) for the Armed Forces of the Republic of Azerbaijan, delivering lectures on IHL in the Military Academy of the Armed Forces, conducting trainings and seminars on IHL for the servicemen, ensuring their participation in regional and international courses, monitors the civilian population’s living conditions in the areas near the Line of Confrontation (LOC) of the armed forces of Armenia and Azerbaijan, through the visits to these places, creation conditions for agricultural activities of civilian population living near the Line of Confrontation of the armed forces of the Armenia and Azerbaijan through launching of some social oriented projects, cooperation in arranging and conducting humanitarian assistance.

List of Ministers

ADR

Heads of Military Department of Azerbaijan SSR
People's Commissars for Military and Naval Affairs of Azerbaijan SSR

Azerbaijan Republic

See also
Azerbaijani Armed Forces
Military history of Azerbaijan
Prime Minister of Azerbaijan
Cabinet of Azerbaijan

References

External links
 Official Website
 Azerbaijani Army being reformed according to NATO standards

Government of Azerbaijan
Azerbaijan
Military of Azerbaijan
Defense
1991 establishments in Azerbaijan